Homp is a surname. Notable people with the surname include:

Tobias Homp (born 1963), German footballer and manager 
 (born 1991), German footballer

See also
Homps (disambiguation)

Surnames of German origin